"Malamente" (stylised in all caps; officially "Malamente – Cap 1: Augurio") is a song recorded by Spanish singer and songwriter Rosalía from her second studio album El mal querer (2018). Written by Rosalía and C. Tangana and produced by El Guincho and co-produced by Rosalía herself, it was released on 30 May 2018 through Columbia Records as the album's lead single.

"Malamente" mixes flamenco with urban and pop music. It received positive reviews, and was nominated for five Latin Grammy Awards, including Song of the Year and Record of the Year, winning for Best Alternative Song and Best Urban Fusion/Performance. Billboard and Pitchfork named it one of the songs that defined the 2010s. Journalist and writer Leila Cobo included the song in her book La fórmula 'Despacito''', which gathers the most emblematic hits of Latin music of the last 50 years. With this release, media dubbed the artist as "Hurricane Rosalía".

Background and release
At the end of April 2018, Rosalía published a short documentary video to her social media accounts where she talked about her new album. She said: "Everything I have I am leaving it here; I'm in the red, I'm risking a lot. This project is what I've always wanted to do, I've been thinking for a long time about making an album like the one I'm going to release. The flamenco inspiration is still there but, at the same time, it is something else." Three days after the international release of the song "Brillo", composed by herself and in collaboration with Colombian rapper J Balvin, the singer announced in her social networks that she was going to release a new single in the coming days. Finally, on 29 May 2018 she unveiled the release date of this new single, as well as its title.

Composition and lyrics
"Malamente" was written in the island of El Hierro and talks about a toxic relationship and how the woman knew that something wrong was going to happen in her life. The song forms the introductory part of its parent album's narrative arc, which is inspired by the 13th-century Occitan novel Flamenca. The novel revolves around themes of gender violence and tragic romance; how a man falls in love with a woman and, because of jealousy, he locks her up in a tower. In the song, Rosalía narrates that even though everyone is warning her that their relationship is doomed, she will continue with it to the point of getting married.

Critical reception
The American magazine Pitchfork called the singer's voice "a soft liquid velvet" and wrote that "'Malamente' consumes the listener with drums and soft synthesizers that drag you to their world completely". The Guardian commented on the following about the Catalan singer: "Rosalía is the most exciting thing that is going to happen to music this 2018". The single was nominated in five categories at the 2018 Latin Grammys. "Malamente" won two of these awards for Best Alternative Song and Best Urban Fusion/Performance.

In September 2020, Billboard named "Malamente" the 32nd best Latin song of all time and stated that "Rosalía's contemporary, hip hop/electronic take on traditional flamenco was different from anything heard before. Released in tandem with a stunning, provocative video full of imagery and Spanish symbolism, 'Malamente' broke ranks, visually and musically, amalgamating Rosalía's flamenco vocals with loops, beats, and raps, turning every preconception about her country's iconic musical tradition on its head". Also, Pitchfork named "Malamente" the 23rd best song of the 2010s.

Commercial performance
The music video, produced by the audiovisual company Canada, was played more than a million times two days after its release and accumulated two million views for 3 June on YouTube, as well as a million streams on Spotify. The song debuted in the fourth position on the PROMUSICAE musical chart. "Malamente" was certified a Gold Record in Spain in the first week of July, as well as a platinum record in August 2018. Finally, in October of that same year it was certified double platinum. In November, the song reached the second position in the Spanish Song Charts thanks to the album release.

The track was included in many soundtracks of TV shows and movies and has been featured in their respective soundtracks. These include the first season of Elite, the second season of The OA, Euphoria and Good Girls as well as in the soundtrack of the 2019 movie Hellboy.

Live performances

"Malamente" was performed for the first time at the Sónar music festival, held at the Fira de Montjuïc on 15 June of that year. A couple weeks later, Rosalía presented it again at the Festival Cultura Inquieta held in the city of Getafe, near Madrid. At the end of July, "Malamente" was performed at the Plaza de Quintana in Santiago de Compostela and at Starlite Festival in Marbella, where she opened for Rozalén. On 5 September, the singer served as the opening act for Juanes at the Hollywood Bowl. A week later, Rosalía presented "Malamente" for the first time in Miami to celebrate her five Latin Grammy nominations. At the end of September, Rosalía performed at the Flamenco Biennial in Seville, where she played the theme. On 16 October, the Barcelonian went on the BBC program Later... with Jools Holland'', where she sang "Malamente" and "Pienso en tu mirá". A day later, Rosalía offered a concert at the Village Underground in London, where she returned to perform the song for the second time. On 31 October 2018 she performed "Malamente" in front of 11,000 people at a free concert brought by Red Bull at the Plaza de Colón, in Madrid. Two days later she performed the song again at Los 40 Music Awards. On 4 November, Rosalía performed the song at the 2018 MTV Europe Music Awards gala, held in the city of Bilbao. On 11 November, she performed "Malamente" at Casa Patas, Madrid, an iconic place for flamenco artists and lovers. On 15 November, she performed the song at the 2018 Latin Grammys ceremony in Las Vegas.

Music video
The music video for the song was released simultaneously with the single on digital platforms. It was directed and produced by the company Canada, marking the third time that they worked with the Spanish singer after videos for "De plata" and "Aunque es de noche", and filmed simultaneously with the "Pienso en tu Mirá" video.

Marked by its poetic symbolism, the video is considered a "visual poem" interpreted as omens for the failure of a love relationship. The imagery includes a man in a typical Holy Week capirote riding a skateboard with nails, which spawned a certain controversy for its religious implications, or Rosalía riding a motorbike that is bullfought by a man in a white studio set. Other alternated scenes show Rosalía dancing inside the back of a truck or being hit by a car. The music video was filmed between Barcelona, Badalona, Barberà del Vallès and l'Hospitalet de Llobregat and despicts Rosalia in the industrial zone of the city, recreating the constant truck traffic and industries that there are in her hometown Sant Esteve Sesrovires.

"Malamente" was nominated for three UK Video Music Awards out of which won two: Best Pop Video and Best Direction. The video also received nominations for Best Music Video at the Latin Grammy Awards and Video of the Year at the Premio Lo Nuestro 2019.

Charts

Weekly charts

Year-end charts

Certifications

Release history

References

2018 in Spanish music
2018 songs
Latin Grammy Award for Best Alternative Song
Latin Grammy Award for Best Urban Fusion/Performance
Music videos shot in Spain
Rosalía songs
Spanish-language songs
Song recordings produced by el Guincho
Songs written by el Guincho
Songs written by Rosalía